Kratovo is an urban locality (a suburban (dacha) settlement) in Ramensky District of Moscow Oblast, Russia, located  southeast of Moscow.  Population: 

Zoe Williams of The Guardian wrote that Kratovo "resembles a Russian Guildford with high hedges, gigantic trees, the careful, botanical planning of expensive privacy." and that the locality "has a reputation for being full of former KGB safe houses, though I couldn’t find one Moscovite who would vouch for that."

History
On 10 June 2017, a 50-year-old man opened fire on passers-by in the settlement, killing four people.

Notable people
Yuriy Borzakovskiy, who took home the gold in the men's 800-meter run at the 2004 Summer Olympics in Athens, was born in Kratovo. Sergei Eisenstein and Sergei Prokofiev had dachas here.

George Blake, famous Cold War spy [b.1922] lives in a dacha in Kratovo.

References

External links 

Urban-type settlements in Moscow Oblast